The acyl carrier protein (ACP) is a cofactor of both fatty acid and polyketide biosynthesis machinery. It is one of the most abundant proteins in cells of E. coli. In both cases, the growing chain is bound to the ACP via a thioester derived from the distal thiol of a 4'-phosphopantetheine moiety.

Structure
The ACPs are small negatively charged α-helical bundle proteins with a high degree of structural and amino acid similarity. The structures of a number of acyl carrier proteins have been solved using various NMR and crystallography techniques. The ACPs are related in structure and mechanism to the peptidyl carrier proteins (PCP) from nonribosomal peptide synthases.

Biosynthesis
Subsequent to the expression of the inactive apo ACP, the 4'-phosphopantetheine moiety is attached to a serine residue.  This coupling is mediated by acyl carrier protein synthase (ACPS), a 4'-phosphopantetheinyl transferase. 4'-Phosphopantetheine is a prosthetic group of several acyl carrier proteins including the acyl carrier proteins (ACP) of fatty acid synthases, ACPs of polyketide synthases, the peptidyl carrier proteins (PCP), as well as aryl carrier proteins (ArCP) of nonribosomal peptide synthetases (NRPS).

References

External links
 

Proteins